Ginger Snaps is a 2000 Canadian supernatural horror film directed by John Fawcett and written by Karen Walton, from a story they jointly developed. The film stars Emily Perkins and Katharine Isabelle as Brigitte and Ginger Fitzgerald, two morbid teenage sisters whose relationship is tested when Ginger (who has started her period for the first time) is attacked and bitten by a unknown animal, and then later, during the next full moon, slowly starts to transform into a lycanthrope (werewolf). The supporting cast features Kris Lemche, Jesse Moss, Danielle Hampton, John Bourgeois, Peter Keleghan, and Mimi Rogers.

After premiering at the Munich Fantasy Filmfest in August 2000 and screening at the 2000 Toronto International Film Festival, Ginger Snaps received a limited theatrical release in May 2001. Despite modest box office receipts, the film was a critical success. It has since amassed a cult following and has been reexamined for its feminist themes. It was followed by a sequel, Ginger Snaps 2: Unleashed, and a prequel, Ginger Snaps Back: The Beginning, which were filmed back-to-back and both released in 2004.

Plot
In Bailey Downs, a rash of dog killings has been occurring. Brigitte and Ginger Fitzgerald are teenage sisters who harbor a fascination with death, and as children, formed a pact to move out of the suburb or die together by the age of 16. One night, while on the way to kidnap a dog owned by school bully Trina Sinclair, Ginger begins her first period. The scent of blood results in the girls being attacked by the creature responsible for the maulings. The creature bites Ginger. As the girls flee, the creature is run over by a van belonging to Sam Miller, a local drug dealer.

Following the attack, Ginger undergoes transformations that concern Brigitte. Her wounds heal quickly, and she starts to behave aggressively, grow hair from her scars, sprout a tail, and menstruate heavily. She proceeds to go out with her with classmate Jason McCardy. As they wrestle for control, he requests to use protection, she mounts him, bites his neck and has sex with him. Later, she furiously beats Trina in public, and kills a neighbor's dog. Brigitte seeks out Sam to get information on what his van struck, and they agree that Ginger was attacked by a werewolf and is transforming into one. Sam suggests infusing an extract of monkshood, a perennial plant.

Trina accuses Ginger of kidnapping her dog. She fights with Ginger and is accidentally killed. The sisters hide the body in a freezer. Brigitte accidentally breaks off two of Trina's fingers, and the fingers are misplaced. On Halloween, Brigitte brings monkshood to Sam and he creates a monkshood extract. Brigitte is attacked by Jason (who was infected by Ginger when they had sex), and defends herself by using the monkshood syringe on him. She witnesses his immediate change in behavior, which proves it is a cure. At school, she discovers Ginger's murder of a faculty member and witnesses her killing another. Ginger discloses her intent to target Sam next at the Greenhouse Bash, a Halloween party hosted by him.

The girls' mother finds the fingers and Trina's corpse. She drives Brigitte to the Greenhouse Bash, saying that she will protect them. Brigitte arrives to find Ginger hurting Sam for rejecting her sexual advances. Brigitte wounds Ginger's and her own palm and clasps their hands together, infecting herself with Ginger's blood. She convinces Ginger of her loyalty and willingness to help her. As the sisters leave, Brigitte decides to abandon her mother. Ginger feels her transformation approaching and Sam knocks her unconscious with a shovel. They take Ginger back to the Fitzgerald house to prepare more of the cure for her.

Ginger transforms into a werewolf on the way home and escapes the van. Sam and Brigitte hide in the pantry as Sam makes the cure. When he goes to find Ginger, a transformed Ginger attacks him. After finding Sam, injured and bloody, Brigitte tries to save him by drinking his blood to calm Ginger, but is unable to go through with it. Ginger senses Brigitte's insincerity, and kills Sam.

As Ginger stalks Brigitte, Brigitte returns to the room where they grew up. Brigitte defends herself while holding the syringe in one hand and a knife in the other. Ginger lunges at Brigitte and into the knife, fatally wounding herself. Brigitte lays her head upon her dying sister's chest and weeps.

Cast

Nick Nolan portrayed both the initial werewolf (nicknamed "the Beast of Bailey Downs" by the town's residents) and the "Gingerwolf", the werewolf which Ginger becomes.

Production

Development
Director John Fawcett has said: "I knew that I wanted to make a metamorphosis movie and a horror film. I also knew that I wanted to work with girls". In January 1995, he talked to screenwriter Karen Walton, who was initially reluctant to write the script due to the horror genre's reputation for weak characters, poor storytelling, and a negative portrayal of women. However, Fawcett convinced Walton the film would re-interpret the genre. Walton has said, "a lot of werewolf movies seemed very much the same. My favourite was of course An American Werewolf in London, because it was at least a little punk about it, but it was still two white dudes grappling with the beast inside of them... I love stories that work on a lot of different levels, for a whole bunch of different kinds of people. That it turned out to be OK in the marketplace as just one girl's voice – and a director who really wanted to support that – is remarkable, I think, for the day".

Fawcett and Walton encountered trouble financing the film. They approached producer Steve Hoban, with whom they had worked before, and he agreed to produce the film. Hoban employed Ken Chubb to edit and polish the story, and after two years they were ready to seek financiers.

Motion International committed to co-financing and Canadian distribution, and Trimark Pictures agreed to be the co-financier, U.S. distributor, and international sales agent. The film seemed ready to go into production by fall of 1998; however, negotiations with Trimark caused the producers to miss the budgeting deadline for Telefilm Canada, the Canadian federal film funding agency. Rather than go ahead with only 60% of the funding, Hoban decided to wait a year for Telefilm's funding. During this interval, Trimark dropped the film. Lionsgate Films, who Trimark would end up merging with in 2000, took Trimark's place, and Unapix Entertainment agreed to distribute the film on DVD, along with Artisan Entertainment for the American DVD release. The film's budget was $4.5 million.

Casting
Casting the two leads met with substantial difficulty. While a casting director was easily found for Los Angeles, Canadian casting directors proved to be appalled by the horror, gore, and language. When one finally agreed to pick up the film, the Columbine shooting and another school shooting in Alberta suddenly thrust the public spotlight on violent teenagers. The Toronto Stars announcement that Telefilm was funding a "teen slasher movie" met with a flurry of debate and outrage in the media, which generated a significant amount of adverse publicity in proportion to the size of the project.

Casting took place in Los Angeles, New York, Toronto, Montreal, and Vancouver. Perkins and Isabelle auditioned on the same day at their agency in Vancouver, reading to one another off-camera. When their taped auditions arrived, screenwriter Karen Walton said that they were exactly as she had pictured the characters.

Coincidentally, both actresses were born in the same hospital, attended the same preschool, elementary, and private schools, and are at the same agency. Perkins was twenty-two at the time and Isabelle four years younger, but Perkins was cast as the younger sister.

Attention then turned to the next most important characters: the drug dealer and the mother roles. Mimi Rogers readily agreed to play the mother, Pamela, saying that she liked the black humour and comic relief in the role. Robin Cook, the Canadian casting director, put forward one of her favourites, Kris Lemche, for the role of drug dealer Sam. After seeing Kris's audition, Fawcett hired him.

In 2021, Fawcett revealed that Scarlett Johansson was originally offered the role of Brigitte, but her mother did not want her involved after reading a National Post article about a boycott of the film by casting directors in Canada.

Shooting

Principal photography took place between October 25 and December 6, 1999, lasting a little over six weeks. Three of Toronto's suburbs, Etobicoke, Brampton (Kris Lemche's hometown), and Scarborough served as the suburb of Bailey Downs. Shooting outside during Toronto's winter for sixteen hours a day, six days a week meant that sicknesses would make their rounds through the cast and crew every few weeks.

On the first day of shooting in the suburbs, all the still photographs for the title sequence were created. The bloody, staged deaths drew a crowd and Fawcett worried about upsetting the neighbours. The girls were covered in fake blood for the shots, and at the time, a homeowner's basement served as their changing room. Each time they needed to change, someone had to distract the homeowner's four-year-old child.

Long shooting days pushed the earliest possible start later each day until the scenes written for day were being shot after late into the night. Director of photography Thom Best solved the problem by using diffusion gel and four eighteen kilowatt lamps which generated enough light to be seen a mile high in the sky.

The special effects proved to be a major hardship, as Fawcett eschewed CGI effects and preferred to use more traditional means of prosthetics and make-up. Consequently, Isabelle had to spend up to seven hours in the makeup chair to create Ginger's metamorphosis and a further two hours to remove them. Often covered in sticky fake blood that required Borax and household detergent to remove, she further endured wearing contacts that hindered her vision and teeth that meant she could not speak without a lisp. The most aggravating thing was the full facial prosthetic which gave her a permanently runny nose that she had to stop with cotton swabs.

Post-production
Beginning in December 1999, Brett Sullivan worked with Fawcett for eight weeks to create the final cut of the film. Despite the short time for editing, the film was nominated for a Genie in editing. Despite a similarly tight schedule in the sound department, the film would also be nominated for a Genie in sound editing.

Soundtrack
The soundtrack was released on Roadrunner Records.

Release
Ginger Snaps premiered at the Munich Fantasy Filmfest in August 2000. The following month, it played at the Toronto International Film Festival, where it briefly received media attention following the positive word-of-mouth it had built up from Munich. Although called one of the stand-outs of the Toronto festival, attention died off and the film followed an unfocused release strategy, playing at various film festivals and building up more word-of-mouth. Ginger Snaps was released to Canadian cinemas in May 2001. It grossed CAD $425,753 domestically, making it the fifth highest-grossing Canadian film between December 2000 and November 2001. Owing to a cult following, it has achieved significant video and DVD sales. These earnings, combined with moderate theatrical success abroad, led to the production of two further films.

Reception
The film has a 90% approval rating on review aggregator website Rotten Tomatoes, based on 58 reviews; the average rating is 7.4/10. The site's consensus reads: "The strong female cast and biting satire of teenage life makes Ginger Snaps far more memorable than your average werewolf movie – or teen flick". Critics' praise was centered on the quality of acting by the two leads, the horrific metamorphosis reminiscent of Cronenberg, the use of lycanthropy as a metaphor for puberty, and the dark humour. Scott Tobias of The A.V. Club wrote that the film was "seemingly left for dead" after playing at the 2000 Toronto International Film Festival but is now considered a cult film. It is ranked 78 on Time Out London'''s list of 100 best horror films, Tom Huddleston calling it "the best teenage werewolf movie, period".

Critics who panned the film thought the puberty metaphor was too obvious, the characters too over-the-top (especially the mother), and the dark humour and horror elements unbalanced.Chambers, Bill. "Ginger Snaps " (2001). filmfreakcentral.net. Retrieved November 19, 2006.

Because the film links lycanthropy to menstruation and features two sisters, Ginger Snaps lends itself to a feminist critique. Feminist scholar Bianca Nielsen wrote: "By simultaneously depicting female bonds as important and fraught with difficulties, Ginger Snaps portrays the double-binds teenage girls face. Ginger is an embodiment of these impossible binaries: she is at once sexually attractive and monstrous, 'natural' and 'supernatural', human and animal, 'feminine' and transgressive, a sister and a rival".

Accolades

Sequel, prequel, and television series
Based on successful DVD sales, both a sequel, Ginger Snaps 2: Unleashed, and a prequel, Ginger Snaps Back: The Beginning, were filmed back-to-back in 2003. Even though Ginger Snaps 2 had a wider release than the original, it underperformed at the box office. Consequently, Ginger Snaps Back: The Beginning'' went direct-to-video. In October 2020, a television series was announced to be in development.

Explanatory notes

References

External links
 Official website (cached)
 Official UK website
 
 
 
 
 

Ginger Snaps films
2000 films
2000 horror films
2000s Canadian films
2000s coming-of-age films
2000s English-language films
2000s female buddy films
2000s high school films
2000s teen horror films
Artisan Entertainment films
Canadian body horror films
Canadian coming-of-age films
Canadian high school films
Canadian werewolf films
Copperheart Entertainment films
English-language Canadian films
Halloween horror films
Films about sisters
Films directed by John Fawcett
Films set in Canada
Films shot in Toronto
Goth subculture